Herbert Milton Stempel (December 19, 1926 – April 7, 2020) was an American television game show contestant and subsequent whistleblower on the fraudulent nature of the industry, in what became known as the 1950s quiz show scandals. His rigged six-week appearance as a winning contestant on the 1950s show Twenty-One ended in an equally rigged defeat by Columbia University teacher and literary scion Charles Van Doren.

Early life 
A self-described "avid reader" as a child, who was "interested in everything", Stempel attended P.S. 89 in Queens. He was skipped ahead several classes in school, so much so that his mother worried he was being pushed too far. When he was seven, his father died, and Stempel, his mother, and his older sister Harriet moved to what he describes as a "poorer part of the Bronx". It was in the midst of the Depression, and the struggling family was on public assistance for years.

Twenty-One was not Stempel's first quiz show. At a very young age Stempel realized he had what he refers to as a "retentive memory", in that he could read a page about a subject and then, months later, summarize that page. He represented his elementary school, P.S. 6, on a radio quiz show, Americana History, where he remained undefeated for several weeks. He was part of the "Kid Wizards", a three-man team who represented The Bronx High School of Science in competitions against New York high schools, remaining undefeated throughout the year. He claims his IQ has been measured at 170.

Stempel graduated from the Bronx High School of Science in January 1944. He briefly attended classes at City College of New York (CCNY) before enlisting in the United States Army. He served in the 311th Regiment of the 78th Infantry Division and was on the front lines in Europe for a month before the war ended. Stempel remained in the Army for the next seven years, attending counterintelligence school in Baltimore, Maryland and serving as "an agent" until 1952, when he began work in the United States Post Office as a clerk. He married his wife, Toby, in 1954 and returned to CCNY on the G.I. Bill.

Twenty-One 

In 1956, after tuning in to a new program, Twenty-One, he was intrigued by the questions and wrote to Dan Enright, the show's producer, asking to be a contestant.  The qualifying trivia test took a grueling three-and-a-half hours; Stempel got 251 out of 363 questions right, which he claimed was the highest score ever achieved.

At a time when the top five highest-rated programs on television were quiz shows, Twenty-One was a mainstay for Barry & Enright Productions and NBC, which aired the show:

Contestants on Twenty-One were given the questions and answers in advance and were coached as if they were actors, receiving instructions on which questions to answer correctly or incorrectly and how to behave during the game.

The champion 
Several weeks later, Enright paid Stempel a visit while his wife was out at the theater and he was looking after their young son, and posed the fateful question: "How would you like to make $25,000?" Stempel immediately understood the implications; Enright was not going to pay him just for appearing on the show, when he could be easily defeated.

Stempel was not only provided with coaching on the answers and directions on how to deliver them, but on his physical appearance as well. Stempel was married to a woman whose family had money and the couple was not suffering financially, but Enright decided that the image of an underdog, a penniless GI working his way through school, would appeal to the American public. Enright personally selected his wardrobe: an oversized, baggy double-breasted suit that had belonged to Stempel's late father-in-law, a blue shirt with a frayed collar, "terrible looking" tie and an old "Timex watch that ticked like an alarm clock", the sound of which would be picked up by the studio microphone and thus help build suspense.

Enright later explained the reasons behind this:

You want the viewer to react emotionally to a contestant. Whether he reacts favorably or negatively is really not that important. The important thing is that he reacts. He should watch a contestant, hoping that the contestant will win or he should watch the contestant, hoping the contestant will lose. And Herb, I felt, was the type of personality who instilled the latter. Viewers would watch him and pray for his opponent to win. ... When he applied to the show and he took the test, he scored a very, very high score. He was the type of contestant who could very well antagonize viewers.

The defeated 
Stempel ostensibly won $69,500, which was presented to him as an unnotarized "settlement" agreement.

Even though Stempel agreed to take less money, that actually made no difference: his ratings were dropping and the producers decided he had to go. A new contestant was selected to challenge him and knock him off. He was an English instructor at Columbia University, Charles Van Doren. Van Doren was persuaded to go along with the fraud by an appeal that his appearance would help glamorize information and intellectualism. His impact was immediate and his name quickly became synonymous with quiz shows. For week after week, the two men battled it out, tying with scores of 21–21, as tens of millions of Americans tuned in to see if their new hero would beat Stempel.

Enright promised Stempel a subsequent television job if he would finish the performance they had started, but the final act, as choreographed by Enright, was particularly humiliating to Stempel.  The question was, "What motion picture won the Academy Award for 1955?"

Years later Dan Enright stated in the WGBH documentary American Experience: The Quiz Show Scandal interview:

On December 5, 1956, Van Doren defeated Stempel before 15 million viewers. Van Doren went on to become the single most popular contestant in the quiz show's early history, while Stempel became the forgotten man. (In the closing minutes of his last Twenty-One appearance, asked what he would do with his winnings, a subdued Stempel said that after provisions were made for his family, he would donate a modest sum to the City College Fund “to repay the people of the city of New York for the free education they have given me”.) After his loss, Stempel overheard one backstage technician say to another: "At least, we finally have a clean-cut intellectual on this program, not a freak with a sponge memory."  Enright's promise to find Stempel a panel show slot after his college graduation went unfulfilled.  When Stempel, who by then had gone through his winnings, later demanded Enright follow through on his original promise, Enright demanded he first sign a statement affirming he had never been coached on Twenty-One.  Again, no show materialized.

Exposure 
When Enright subsequently told him the promise could not be kept because he had sold his shows to NBC itself, Stempel called Jack O'Brian, a columnist who covered television for the New York City Journal-American.  Although O'Brian found the story hung together, the paper's syndicate, fearing a libel suit, refused to print the allegation without further corroboration.  Stempel later testified to Congress that in February 1957 he had spoken with a reporter from the New York Post, but that paper had the same reservations as the Journal-American.  There were no corroborating witnesses or hard evidence to back up Stempel's accusations, and Enright dismissed them as being rooted in jealousy over Van Doren's success.

It took Ed Hilgemeier, a contestant-in-waiting who found a notebook full of answers belonging to Marie Winn, another contestant on the new quiz show Dotto, airing on CBS, to convince authorities and the Journal-American that Stempel should be taken seriously.

Manhattan Assistant District Attorney Joseph Stone, who directed two grand jury probes into the case, states that Enright described Stempel to him as "a disturbed person and a blackmailer" and denied ever giving Stempel advance questions and answers. Three days after Twenty-One contestant Richard Jackman, a writer from Oneonta, New York, told Stone that he, too, had been coached in advance of his appearance on October 3, Twenty-One was canceled. The investigation of the quiz show scandal then began in earnest.  Jackman only realized the game was fixed the night he appeared, when the questions he was asked were identical to the ones Enright had reviewed with him in a "practice session" that afternoon.

Enright quickly countered, denying any wrongdoing or fraud had taken place, suing the Journal-American, and mounting a campaign to discredit Stempel. At a sensational press conference, he attempted to demonstrate that Stempel was mentally unstable by playing a recording of a conversation with him that Enright had secretly taped. To further discredit him, Enright also produced the statement that Stempel had signed earlier, declaring that Twenty-One was an honest program, that Barry and Enright were beyond reproach, and that no rigging had taken place.

Jack O'Brian felt there was an "undercurrent" of coercion going on. Not only did some of the producers lie to the grand jury, they also had urged contestants to perjure themselves. In lower Manhattan, the grand jury was convened for nine months and heard testimony from more than 150 contestants. It is estimated that more than 100 lied under oath.  Stempel continued telling the truth to anyone who would listen, but it was his unsubstantiated word against everyone else's; there was still no hard corroborating evidence.  His testimony to the DA and the grand jury implicated Van Doren in the fraud, but there was massive resistance in accepting this accusation.

Suddenly, to everyone's astonishment, the grand jury testimony was sealed from the public by Judge Mitchell Schweitzer, for reasons that to this day are still not clear.  This was almost an unprecedented move in New York State; in the no fewer than 497 grand jury presentments that had been filed in New York county since 1869, not one had ever been sealed.  Afraid that the public might never learn what the grand jury had uncovered, Frank Hogan, the New York County District Attorney (and a former classmate of Judge Schweitzer), filed a protest in the court of general sessions, spelling out why it was in the public interest to make the findings known. Suspicious of a cover-up, Congress called an immediate investigation. Once just a trivial form of entertainment, quiz shows were now the subject of investigation at the highest level of government.

Stempel told the U.S. House Subcommittee on Legislative Oversight what he told Stone. Particularly jarring was Stempel's revelation that he was strong-armed into incorrectly identifying what was, in fact, one of his favorite films:

The kinescope that has survived of that episode shows that the round in which Stempel was ordered to provide the wrong answer actually ended in a tie. Stempel and Van Doren went on to yet another game during the same show. This time, Stempel failed to recall the name of William Allen White's popular editorials, What's the Matter with Kansas? "It just wouldn't help to guess," Stempel said softly in the booth, "I just don't know."  The miss kept Stempel at zero, and Van Doren answered the questions in the category "Kings" successfully. Stempel drew the evening's biggest laugh when he was asked the fate of four of Henry VIII's wives and answered, "They all died." Stempel answered the question correctly, but when offered their standard opportunity to stop the game, Van Doren stopped it and became the new Twenty-One champion.

As the investigation progressed, Charles Van Doren, now a host on The Today Show, was under pressure from NBC to testify.  To avoid the committee's subpoena, he went into hiding. It was another former Twenty-One contestant, an artist named James Snodgrass, who finally provided indisputable supporting proof that the show had been rigged. Snodgrass had documented every answer he was coached on in a series of registered letters he mailed to himself before the show was taped.

One month after the hearings began, Van Doren emerged from hiding and confessed before the committee that he had been complicit in the fraud.

Life after the scandal 
Following the scandal, Stempel finished college on the G.I. Bill. He went to work for the New York City Transportation Department for the next two decades, performing examinations before trial, which meant he represented the Department in depositions by opposing counsel, testifying to various records in the city's possession.

It was not until he was approached, some thirty years later, by the producers of the documentary The Quiz Show Scandals for PBS's American Experience, that he finally agreed to be interviewed on the subject. Julian Krainin, who co-produced the film, also co-produced the 1994 feature film Quiz Show, in which Stempel was portrayed by John Turturro. Stempel actually made an uncredited film debut in that movie, portraying a different contestant being interviewed by the congressional investigator Dick Goodwin, played by Rob Morrow. When Quiz Show was released, in spite of being "a little miffed by the portrayal", which he thought was "an over-the-top sort of portrayal of me", Stempel embraced the renewed public interest in him, giving interviews on radio and television (notably appearing on Late Night with Conan O'Brien, taped in the same NBC studio Twenty-One once occupied), as well as lecturing at some colleges about the quiz scandals.

In 2008, Charles Van Doren broke his long silence, and in an article in The New Yorker described the overtures Robert Redford's production company made to him to cooperate with the filming of Quiz Show. He claimed that Barry & Enright Productions staffer Albert Freedman was actually responsible for scripting the entire Stempel–Van Doren competition, and rejected the image of Stempel as a penurious CCNY student:

In fact, he was a Marines [Stempel was actually in the U.S. Army] veteran married to a woman of some means who once appeared on the set wearing a Persian-lamb coat and was quickly spirited away so that she wouldn't blow his cover.

Van Doren wrote that until he viewed WGBH's American Experience documentary The Quiz Show Scandals he was ignorant of the fact that the show had once been honest—at least for one episode—and that: "Herb Stempel was the first to agree to the fix".

This last remark is debatable. Dan Enright has stated that due to the sponsor's displeasure he began to rig the show immediately after the premiere episode debuted on September 12, 1956. Whether the contestants in the five weeks before Stempel's choreographed October 17 appearance unwittingly received the answers in "practice sessions" the way Richard Jackman described, or were openly coached the same way Stempel was, is unclear. According to Jackman, an earlier contestant than Stempel, Enright was extremely nervous before his appearance on the show and stated, to Jackman's bewilderment: "You are in a position to destroy my career." After Jackman, a struggling author, told Enright he could not continue on a rigged show, Enright tried various types of persuasion and offers of money to persuade him to change his mind. Jackman finally accepted a check for $15,000, and for continuity's sake promised to appear again so he could publicly choose to take his "winnings" and depart at the beginning of the show. Kent Anderson portrays Enright as someone who would make certain his next contestant would cooperate. Enright is described as deliberately targeting Stempel's emotions, as he did with other contestants; leaving no angle overlooked when trying to gain their full participation.

Stempel died April 7, 2020, almost exactly one year after the death of his rival Charles Van Doren, and at the same age. His death was not publicly announced until nearly two months later.

References

External links
 Herb Stempel's testimony to the U.S. House Subcommittee on Legislative Oversight, 1959
 Investigation of television quiz shows. Hearings before a subcommittee of the Committee on Interstate and Foreign Commerce, House of Representatives, Eighty-sixth Congress, first session, PN I992.8.U5IJ, October 6–12, 1959 ǀ 
 
Twenty-One: Full Stemple and Van Doren Episode

1926 births
2020 deaths
Military personnel from New York City
City College of New York alumni
Contestants on American game shows
Jewish American military personnel
United States Army soldiers
United States Army personnel of World War II
American whistleblowers
The Bronx High School of Science alumni
21st-century American Jews